Costanza Di Camillo (born 25 January 1995) is an Italian synchronised swimmer. She competed in Team at the 2020 Summer Olympics.

She won a bronze medal at the 2018 European Championships, and before a silver medal at the 2016 European Aquatics Championships.

Di Camillo is an athlete of the Gruppo Sportivo della Marina Militare,

References

External links
Costanza Di Camillo profile at FIN web site 

1995 births
Living people
Italian synchronized swimmers
World Aquatics Championships medalists in synchronised swimming
Artistic swimmers at the 2019 World Aquatics Championships
Artistic swimmers at the 2022 World Aquatics Championships
European Aquatics Championships medalists in synchronised swimming
European Championships (multi-sport event) bronze medalists
Swimmers from Rome
Artistic swimmers of Marina Militare
Synchronized swimmers at the 2020 Summer Olympics
Olympic synchronized swimmers of Italy